Vernon Winfield (born August 27, 1949) is a former American football guard. He played for the Philadelphia Eagles from 1972 to 1973.

References

1949 births
Living people
American football guards
Minnesota Golden Gophers football players
Philadelphia Eagles players